Badvel is a Municipality in  Kadapa district of the Indian state of Andhra Pradesh. Badvel Town is located in Two mandals. It is the headquarters of Badvel revenue division. Major portion of Town comes under Badvel mandal and remaining portion of Town comes under Gopavaram Mandal. It comes under Badvel revenue division.

Badvel is the 4th biggest town of Kadapa District followed by Kadapa, Proddutur, Rayachoty. NH-67 passes through Badvel Town. Geographically town is located at the foot hills of  Eastern Ghats.

Assembly constituency
Badvel is an assembly constituency in Andhra Pradesh. Currently it is reserved for SC's.Present Assembly member is Dr.Dasari Sudha.

Education
The primary and secondary school education is imparted by government, aided and private schools, under the School Education Department and it has a Sbvr agricultural college of the state. The medium of instruction followed by different schools are English, Telugu.

References

Cities and towns in Kadapa district